Ningde Nuclear Power Plant is a nuclear power plant in Fujian province, China. The site is located in Beiwan village in the town of Qinyu, Fuding, Ningde, Fujian. The plant will ultimately have six 1,080 megawatt (MWe) CPR-1000 pressurized water reactors (PWRs). The first reactor began operation on 18 April 2013.The Ningde Nuclear Power project was approved by the National Development and Reform Commission (NDRC) in 2007.
The project is 51% funded by the Guangdong Nuclear Investment Company Ltd, with Datang International Power Generation Co and the Fujian Coal Group completing the shareholding. A total investment of 52 billion yuan (US$7.6 billion) should result in the completion of Ningde Phase I.
Including the final two units of Phase II, the total cost will exceed 70 billion yuan. 
The four units of Phase I will generate about 30 billion kilowatt hours per year, for which the plant will charge 0.37 yuan/kW·h (11 billion yuan/year).

Ningde marks a step in the development of China's domestic nuclear industry. 
Shu Guogang, GM of China Guangdong Nuclear Power Project said, "We built 55 percent of Ling Ao Phase 2, 70 percent of Hongyanhe, 80 percent of Ningde and 90 percent of Yangjiang Station."
Site preparation at Ningde ran through 2007, with the first concrete for Ningde 1 poured in February 2008.  
Ningde 2 followed nine months later. Construction of each unit is expected to take 58 months. 
Ningde 1 was grid connected on 28 December 2012 and entered full commercial operation on 18 April 2013.

Reactor data
The Ningde Nuclear Power Plant consist of 4 operational reactors, and 2 reactors planned.

See also

Nuclear power in China
List of nuclear reactors#China

References

External links 
 Images:
 

Nuclear power stations in China
Buildings and structures in Ningde
Nuclear power stations using CPR-1000 reactors
2012 establishments in China
Nuclear power stations with reactors under construction
Nuclear power stations with proposed reactors